What The Hell Is Going On? (1974) (EMI EMA 304) is the only known album of the Australian glam psychedelic rock band Fox. Fox appeared in series 1 episode 4 of Countdown, a popular music television program made by the Australian Broadcasting Corporation, performing "I Said". Australian guitarist John Brownrigg, although not a band member, contributed some of the songwriting.

Artwork 
The front cover artwork features a photograph of the four band members.

Track listing

Charts

Personnel 
Fox
 Peter Laffy - Guitar, Vocals. Laffy later worked with Mondo Rock and Jim Keays.
 Neil Hodgson - Bass, Keyboards
 Michael Upton - Vocals
 Les Oldman - Drums, Percussion, Vocals

Additional personnel
 Col Loughnan - Saxophone

See also 
Encyclopedia of Australian Rock and Pop

Citations

Sources 

Books
 
 Ian McFarlane Encyclopedia of Australian Rock and Pop

Articles
 

Web

External links 
  Fox - What The Hell Is Going On? @ RockOnVinyl
  Peter Laffy FOX '74 songs @ MySpace
  Peter Laffy @ Radris

Fox (Australian band) albums
1974 albums